Miko Äijänen (born 18 July 1997 in Järvenpää) is a Finnish professional squash player. As of December 2019, he was ranked number 91 in the world. He is in the Finnish national team.

On 17 February 2019, Miko Äijänen won gold medal in the Finnish National Championships.

References

1997 births
Living people
Finnish male squash players
People from Järvenpää
Sportspeople from Uusimaa